Verkhneulu-Yelga (Ürge Oloyılğa) is a rural locality (a selo) in Nizhneulu-Yelginsky Selsoviet, Yermekeyevsky District, Bashkortostan, Russia. The population was 182 as of 2010. There is 1 street.

Geography 
Verkhneulu-Yelga is located 9 km southeast of Yermekeyevo (the district's administrative centre) by road. Novonikolayevka is the nearest rural locality.

References 

Rural localities in Yermekeyevsky District